The Ministry of Rural Development is a government ministry that governs in development of rural areas of Cambodia.

References

C
Rural development ministries